The Heidehöhe is a hill, 201.4 metres high, and the highest point in the state of Brandenburg, Germany. Its actual summit, known as the Heideberg, lies over the border in the state of Saxony and reaches a height of 206.1 metres.

See also 
 Kutschenberg

Hills of Brandenburg